The Siamese embassy to France in 1686 was the second such mission from the Kingdom of Siam. The embassy was sent by King Narai and led by ambassador Kosa Pan. This embassy was preceded by the First Siamese Embassy to France, composed of two Siamese ambassadors and Father , who had left Siam for France on January 5, 1684.

The embassy

The embassy set out for France in 1686, accompanying the return of the 1685 French embassy to Siam of Chevalier de Chaumont and François-Timoléon de Choisy on two French ships. The embassy was bringing a proposal for an eternal alliance between France and Siam. It remained in France from June 1686 to March 1687. Kosa Pan was accompanied by two other Siamese ambassadors, Ok-luang Kanlaya Ratchamaitri and Ok-khun Si Wisan Wacha, and by the Jesuit Father Guy Tachard.

Kosa Pan's embassy was met with a rapturous reception and caused a sensation in the courts and society of Europe. The mission landed at Brest, France before continuing its journey to Versailles, constantly surrounded by crowds of curious onlookers.

The "exotic" clothes as well as manners of the envoys (including their kowtowing to Louis XIV during their palace visit on September 1, 1686), together with a special "machine" that was used to carry King Narai's missive to the French monarch caused much comment in French high society. The machine is called butsabok in Thai. Kosa Pan's great interest in French maps and images was noted in a contemporary issue of the Mercure Galant.

Presents
The embassy brought many gifts to present to Louis XIV, including gold, tortoise shells, fabrics, carpets, more than 1,500 pieces of porcelain, and lacquer furniture. Two silver Siamese cannons were presented to Louis XIV; they were seized by French revolutionaries in 1789 to be used in the Storming of the Bastille.

Purchases
The embassy ordered vast amounts of French products to be shipped to the Siamese court: 4,264 mirrors similar to those of the Galerie des Glaces were ordered to decorate Narai's palace, through Jean-Baptiste Colbert to the factory of Saint Gobain. Among other orders were 160 French cannons, telescopes, glasses, clocks and various velvet pieces and crystal decorative elements. They also ordered two geographical globes, inscribed in Thai by French artisans, as well as seven carpets from the Savonnerie manufactory.

Influences

The Siamese Embassy to France in 1686 had brought to the Court samples of multicolor Thai Ikat textiles. These were enthusiastically adopted by the French nobility to become Toiles flammées or Siamoises de Rouen often with checkered blue-and-white designs. After the French Revolution and its repudiation of foreign luxury, the textiles were named "Toiles des Charentes" or cottons of Provence.

A fragmentary Siamese account of the mission compiled by Kosa Pan was discovered in Paris in the 1980s. The embassy's encounter with Louis XIV is depicted in numerous paintings of the period.

The embassy of Kosa Pan was soon followed by another in 1688, led by Ok-khun Chamnan.

See also

France-Thailand relations

Notes

References
 Gunn, Geoffrey C. (2003) First Globalization: The Eurasian Exchange, 1500-1800 Rowman & Littlefield 
 Smithies, Michael (1999), A Siamese embassy lost in Africa 1686, Silkworm Books, Bangkok, 
 Smithies, Michael (2002), Three military accounts of the 1688 "Revolution" in Siam, Itineria Asiatica, Orchid Press, Bangkok, 
 Suarez, Thomas (1999) Early Mapping of Southeast Asia Tuttle Publishing 
 Baghdiantz McCabe, Ina 2008 Orientalism in Early Modern France, Berg Publishing, Oxford
 Schenk, Moritz: Die Reise der siamesischen Botschafter an den Hof des Sonnenkönigs (1686-1687). Zürich, 2013

1686 in France
1686 in international relations
Diplomatic missions in France
France–Thailand relations
History of the foreign relations of France
Foreign relations of the Ayutthaya Kingdom
Treaties of the Kingdom of France